Leonard J. Waks is an American philosopher and scholar working in philosophy with specializations in 
Social and Political Philosophy; Ethics, American Philosophy, and Philosophy of Education. Waks also serves as an author and editor. 
He has held faculty appointments at Purdue University (1966–68), Stanford University (1968-71,  Temple University (1971–present), Distinguished Professor Hangzhou Normal University in China (2018–21), Visiting Professor at Universidad Nacional de Educación UNAE, Ecuador (2017),and is currently Emeritus Professor at Temple University. He served as President of the John Dewey Society for the academic year 2016–17 and received the Society's Lifetime Achievement Award in 2017. He has been a member of the American Educational Research Association since 1967.

Background
Leonard Waks was born to Meyer Waks and Beatrice (nee Dichter) Waks in Brooklyn, New York in 1942. He graduated from Malverne Senior High School in 1960. He attended the University of Wisconsin-Madison, earning a BA in 1965 and a PhD in 1968. In 2022, he resided in Lourinhã, Portugal. He married Veronica G. Waks in 1997; she is a naturopathic physician; they have one son.

Contributions
Waks has published extensively in the field of Philosophy of Education. Waks was co-founder and program chair of the National Technological Literacy Conferences (awarded first prize for creative programming in 1985 by the University Council on Educational Administration), and was conference director of the 2016 conference on democratic education in celebration of the centennial of the publication of John Dewey's Democracy and Education in Washington D. C. He is the founding editor of Dewey Studies. Waks directed the Center for East-West Studies in Education at Hangzhou Normal University in China (2018–21). His work continues to focus on the relationship between emerging technologies and education, and John Dewey's philosophy of education.

Awards and honors
Past President, John Dewey Society (2016-2017).
Lifetime Achievement Award John Dewey Society (2017).

Selected publications

Books
Avila, JuliAnna; Ryd, A G; & Waks, L. J. (2021). The Contemporary Relevance of John Dewey's Theories on Teaching and Learning: Deweyan Perspectives on Standardization, Accountability, and Assessment in Education Routledge.
Waks, L. J. (2015). Education 2.0: The LearningWeb Revolution and the Transformation of the School. Routledge.
Waks, L. J. & English, A. (Eds.) (2017). John Dewey's Democracy and Education: A Centennial Handbook. Cambridge University Press.  
Waks, L. J. (2016). The Evolution and Evaluation of Massive Open Online Courses: MOOCs in Motion. Palgrave-Macmillan.
Waks, L. J. (2015). Listening to Teach: Beyond Didactic Pedagogy. SUNY Press.

Articles
Waks, Leonard J.  (1968). Knowledge and understanding as educational aims. The Monist, 52 (1), 104-119. 
Waks, Leonard J.  (1969). Philosophy, education and the doomsday threat. Review of Educational Research, 39(5), 607-621. 
Waks, Leonard J.  (1973). Non-behavioral goals: Investigating the validity of the two-defect argument. Curriculum Theory Network, 4(1), 37-42. 
Waks, Leonard J.  (1975) Freedom and desire in the Summerhill philosophy of education. In D. Nyberg (Ed.), The philosophy of open education (pp. 195-208). Routledge and Kegan Paul.
Waks, Leonard J.  (1975). Educational objectives and existential heroes. In Smith, R. (Ed.), Regaining educational leadership: Essays critical of PBTE/CBTE (pp. 87-103). New York: Wiley. 
Waks, Leonard J.  (1985). Functionalism and the autonomy of religion. Teachers College Record, 87(1), 271-276. 
Waks, Leonard J.  (1987). A technological literacy credo. Bulletin of Science, Technology and Society, 7(1), 357- 366. 
Waks, Leonard J.   ( 1988). Design principles  for laboratory education in the creative process. Person-Centered Review, 3(4), 463—478
Waks, Leonard J.  (1988). Three contexts for philosophy of education: Intellectual, institutional and ideological. Educational Theory, 38 (2), 167-174. 
Waks, Leonard J.  (1989). The oil in the machine: Human technique in technological society. Research in Philosophy and Technology, 9, 155-170. 
Waks, Leonard J.  (1991). The new world of technology in American education: A case study of policy formation and succession. Technology in Society, 13(1), 233-253. 
Waks, Leonard J.  (1991). Technological literacy for the new majority. In S. Majumar (Ed.), Science education in the United States: Issues, crises, priorities (pp. 446-483). Philadelphia: Pennsylvania Academy of Science. 
Waks, Leonard J.  (1991). Science-technology-society education and the paradox of green studies. In P. Durbin (Ed.), Europe, America and technology: Philosophical perspectives. Philosophy and Technology, 9, 247-257. 
Waks, Leonard J.  (1991). Ivan Illich and Deschooling Society: A reappraisal. In P. Durbin (Ed.), Europe, America and technology: Philosophical perspectives. Philosophy and Technology, 9, 57-73. 
Waks, Leonard J.  (1992). STS in U. S. School Science: Perceptions of Selected Leaders and Their Implications for STS Education. Science Education 76(1): 79-90  (With Barbara Barchi)
Waks, Leonard J.  (1992). Philosophers and social responsibility in technological society. In J. Pitt & E. Lugo, (Eds.), The technology of discovery and the discovery of technology, Society for Philosophy of Technology,
Waks, Leonard J.  (1993). Science-technology-society as an academic field and a social movement. Technology in Society, 15, 399-408. 
Waks, Leonard J.  (1995). Emptiness. In J. Garrison & A. G. Rud (Eds.), The educational conversation: Closing the gap (pp. 85-95). Albany NY: SUNY Press.  
Waks, Leonard J.  (1996). Citizenship in transition: Globalization, technology and education. International Journal of Technology and Design Education, 6, 287-300. 
Waks, Leonard J.  (1996). Environmental claims and citizen rights. Environmental Ethics, 18, 133-148. 
Waks, Leonard J.  (1997) Public intellectuals and interdisciplinary studies. Research in Philosophy and Technology, 16, 61-72. 
Waks, Leonard J.  (1997). The project method in post-industrial education, Journal of Curriculum Studies, 29(4), 391-406. 
Waks, Leonard J.  (1998) Experimentalism and the flow of experience. Educational Theory, 48(1), 1-19. 
Waks, Leonard J.  (1998). Four basic questions about high-tech education. Technology in Society, 20(3), 275-286. 
Waks, Leonard J.  (1998). Post-experimentalist pragmatism. Studies in Philosophy and Education, 17(1), 17-28. 
Waks, Leonard J.  (1999). The continuum of means-ends and the reconciliation of science and art in the later philosophy of John Dewey. Transactions of the C. S. Peirce Society, 35(3), 595-612. 
Waks, Leonard J.  (1999). Reflective practice in the design studio and teacher education, Journal of Curriculum Studies 31 (3), 303-316. 
Waks, Leonard J.  (2001). Computer-mediated experience and education. Educational Theory, 51(4), 415-432. 
Waks, Leonard J.  (2003). How globalization can cause fundamental curriculum change. Journal of Educational Change, 4(4), 383-418. Reprinted in H. Lauder, P. Brown, & A. Halsey (Eds.). (2006), Education, globalization, and social change (pp. 835-851). Oxford: Oxford University Press.

References

External links

 Publications of Leonard J. Waks on Google Scholar
John Dewey Society

1942 births
Living people
Philosophers of education
Temple University faculty
University of Wisconsin–Madison alumni